Fairy Hill is a hamlet located in the Qu'Appelle Valley of Saskatchewan, Canada. It is located in the Rural Municipality of Longlaketon No. 219 on the crossroads of Saskatchewan Highway 6 and Saskatchewan Highway 99. The community is a neighbour to nearby Southey, Glenbrea, Kennell, and the Piapot First Nation. A post office existed in Fairy Hill from 1901 to 1969. Today, the locality is home to multiple farms along with the Fairy Hill Trails.

History 
The post office in Fairy Hill opened in 1901, and the first postmaster was Robert Mollard. The name Fairy Hill was chosen by the postmaster's wife. It is named after the Fairy Hill Estate on the Isle of Wight in England, which is the birthplace of Henry Cyril Lawson who founded the nearby Glen Ranche in 1895. Lawson died in 1940, and the town's post office closed in 1969.

Geography 
The hamlet is situated at the bottom of the Qu'Appelle Valley at one of the more wide points in the valley. It sits around 502 m (1650 ft) above sea level, and is one of the lowest points in the area.

Climate 
Fairy Hill experiences a humid continental climate (Köppen climate classification Dfb, USDA Plant Hardiness Zone  with warm summers and cold winters, prone to extremes at all times of the year.

Politics 
Fairy Hill is a part of the federal riding of Moose Jaw-Lake Centre-Lanigan, which elected Conservative candidate Tom Lukiwski in 2015. In provincial politics, the hamlet is the Last Mountain-Touchwood riding, with Glen Hart, who has also won this riding the past 5 elections in a row, as the elected MLA. The area is situated mostly in the Rural Municipality of Longlaketon No. 219, while the rest is located in Lumsden No. 189. Delbert Schmidt is the current reeve of  Longlaketon No. 219, and Kent Farago is the reeve of Lumsden No. 189.

Fairy Hill Trails 
The Fairy Hill Trails are located south of the Qu'Appelle River. The trails are home to many Geocaches and, as of 2017, can be walked virtually on Google Street View. The trails span 1,642 acres of grassland and parkland, and the area is a popular spot for local fishers, hunters, hikers, and bird watchers. Marshlands, known as the Fairy Hill Marsh, are located near the trails. The marshland provides habitat for shorebirds and migrating ducks and geese.

References

External links 

 Longlaketon No. 219 Website

Longlaketon No. 219, Saskatchewan
Division No. 6, Saskatchewan